Micropterix eatoniella is a species of moth belonging to the family Micropterigidae. It was described by Heath in 1986. It is only known from the type locality Annaba in Algeria.

References

Endemic fauna of Algeria
Micropterigidae
Moths described in 1986
Moths of Africa
Taxa named by John Heath